Carlos Paz may refer to:
Carlos Paz de Araújo, Brazilian American scientist 
Carlos Paz (baseball), Cuban ballplayer (See 1987 Caribbean Series) 
Carlos Salazar (Colombian footballer), (born Carlos Eduardo Salazar Paz, 1981)
Juan Carlos Paz (1901–1972), Argentine composer
Juan Carlos Paz y Puente (born 1964), Mexican musician and educator

See also
Villa Carlos Paz, a city in the province of Córdoba, Argentina